Olin Earl "Tiger" Teague (April 6, 1910 – January 23, 1981) was a World War II veteran and congressional representative for Texas's 6th congressional district for 32 years, from 1946 to 1978. He is buried in Arlington National Cemetery.

Biography

Early life

Born in Oklahoma and raised in Mena, Arkansas, Teague graduated from the Agricultural and Mechanical College of Texas (now Texas A&M University) in 1932. He joined the Army in 1940 as a lieutenant and was discharged in 1946 as a colonel. He participated in the D-Day invasion of Normandy, and was a decorated combat veteran of World War II, receiving the Silver Star with two clusters, the Bronze Star, and two Purple Hearts. The nickname "Tiger" came from his play on the football field while in high school.

Congressional career

While in Congress, he was the veteran's champion, authoring more veterans' legislation than any congressman before him. He was one of the majority of the Texan delegation to decline to sign the 1956 Southern Manifesto opposing the desegregation of public schools ordered by the Supreme Court in Brown v. Board of Education. However, Teague voted against the Civil Rights Acts of 1957, 1960, 1964, and 1968, as well as the 24th Amendment to the U.S. Constitution and the Voting Rights Act of 1965.

He proposed 50 amendments in Congress, including: Providing for the election of President and Vice President; to abolish the electoral college (1953), Provides representation for the people of the District of Columbia (1957), Relative to appointment of postmasters (1959), Proposal with respect to the appointment of postmasters (1961), Empowering Congress to grant representation in the Congress and among the electors of President and Vice President to the people of the District of Columbia (1950 and 1951 and 1953), Equal rights regardless of sex (1967).

He was instrumental in improving benefits for servicemen's survivors. In 1956, he helped overhaul the survivor's benefits, with the creation of the Dependency and Indemnity Compensation. He was also chairman of the House Democratic Caucus, chairman of the House Committee on Veterans Affairs (1955–1972), and chairman of the House Committee on Science and Astronautics (1973–1978). Before 1973, he also chaired the Manned Space Flight Subcommittee and in that capacity oversaw NASA's efforts to place a man on the moon. In 1976, Teague was pivotal in establishing the Office of Science and Technology Policy.

Legacy
The Olin E. Teague Veterans Center, a VA hospital and health center in Temple, Texas, was named for him. The VA also presents the annual Olin E. Teague Award for contributions to improving the quality of life of disabled veterans. Also named for him were the Olin E. Teague Research Center at Texas A&M, a space research facility, and the original visitor center at the Johnson Space Center (closed in 1992).

References

External links
 
  Retrieved on 2008-02-11
 
 Past Chairmen of the House Veterans Affairs Committee

1910 births
1981 deaths
People from Mena, Arkansas
People from Woodward, Oklahoma
Burials at Arlington National Cemetery
Texas A&M University alumni
United States Army personnel of World War II
United States Army officers
Recipients of the Silver Star
Democratic Party members of the United States House of Representatives from Texas
20th-century American politicians